The 1941 Manitoba general election was held on April 22, 1941 to elect Members of the Legislative Assembly of the Province of Manitoba, Canada.

This election was held shortly after the formation of a coalition government in December 1940.  The coalition was created after the start of World War II, as a display of unity among the different parties in the legislature.

Premier John Bracken's Liberal-Progressives were the dominant force in government, while the Conservative Party under Errick Willis held a secondary position.  The smaller Co-operative Commonwealth Federation and Social Credit League were also included in the government, and had cabinet representation.

The four coalition parties were the only legal political parties in Manitoba in 1941.  The Communist Party had been declared illegal the previous year. Its only Member of the Legislative Assembly (MLA), James Litterick, had been expelled from the legislature and had gone into hiding.

When the coalition was created, Independent MLA Lewis Stubbs was the only legislator who did not join the government side.  He claimed that a healthy opposition was necessary in a parliamentary democracy, and rejected offers to join the government.  Later, Social Credit MLA Salome Halldorson and Conservatives Huntly Ketchen and John Poole also crossed to the opposition. And more were be elected in the 1941 election.

The coalition's victory was a foregone conclusion: in most constituencies, there were no anti-coalition candidates.  The opposition came mostly from anti-coalition dissidents in the governing parties.  These candidates did not run a coordinated campaign, and did not seriously threaten the government.

The Social Credit League split before the election, and most of its candidates were opposed to the coalition.  The party's most prominent MLAs, however, remained on the government side.

In some constituencies, the coalition parties ran candidates against one other.  This had little effect on the overall result, though it did influence the relative strength of the coalition partners after the election.  In most instances, the incumbent candidates were re-elected.  The CCF agreed to limit its challenges against incumbent members, although this courtesy was not always reciprocated by other parties.

As expected, the coalition won a landslide victory.  The government parties, along with pro-coalition independents, won 50 of the 55 seats in the legislature.

The election confirmed the Liberal-Progressives and Conservatives as the dominant parties in government.  The Liberal-Progressives increased their representation from 23 MLAs to 27, only two short of an overall majority.  The Conservatives were not as successful, falling from 16 seats to 12.  The party remained influential in cabinet, however, and its leadership remained committed to the coalition.

For the CCF and Social Credit, the election was problematic. Many CCF members opposed the coalition, and due to the party's official support for the coalition the party had difficulty mobilizing its supporters to the voting booths.  The CCF won only two seats in Winnipeg, and the Gimli constituency, for a total of three seats.  John Queen, the CCF Mayor of Winnipeg, lost the legislative seat he had held since 1920.

After this result, the CCF's tenure in government was brief.  Farmer left the coalition ministry in late 1942, and the party formally voted to leave the coalition at its 1943 convention.  Many CCF officials later described their period in the coalition as a disaster for the party.

The result was also bad for Social Credit, which lost its internal cohesion during the campaign.  All of the party's anti-coalition candidates were defeated, while three pro-government incumbents were re-elected.  These MLAs effectively became an adjunct of the government, and did little in the way of promoting party policy.  The Manitoba Social Credit League was marginalized in the 1940s, and did not become a functioning party again until 1953.

Five pro-coalition Independent MLAs were also elected.

Five anti-coalition MLAs were elected - three dissident Conservatives (one of whom later rejoined the government), Independent Lewis Stubbs, and Bill Kardash.  Kardash, who ran as a "Worker's candidate", was widely known to be associated with the banned Communist Party.  He did not proclaim this association openly, however, and was able to take his seat without a legal challenge. (He was re-elected under the label "Labor-Progressive Party" once being a Communist was no longer illegal.)

Three Sound Money Economics System candidates also ran in Winnipeg.  All fared poorly, and the group disappeared soon after the election.

Like previous elections, all the voters cast preferential votes. Ten MLAs were elected in city-wide Winnipeg district through Single transferable vote; all other MLAs were elected through Instant-runoff voting.

Results

Results by riding
Bold names indicate members returned by acclamation. Italicized names indicate Anti-Coalition candidates returned. Incumbents are marked with *.

Winnipeg
Winnipeg:

Ten MLAs were elected through Single transferable vote.

* - Incumbent
''(Italics indicate Anti-Coalition candidate; bold indicates candidate was declared elected)

{| style="width:100%;"
|-
|

Sources

The first ballot results for Winnipeg and results for all other constituencies are taken from an official Manitoba government publication entitled "Manitoba elections, 1920-1941", cross-referenced with the 1942 Canadian Parliamentary Guide and the "Historical Statement of Votes" section of the 2003 provincial election report.  Unfortunately, the second-ballot results are not listed in these sources.

All ballot results for Winnipeg after the first count are taken from reports in the Winnipeg Free Press newspaper. It is possible that some errors appeared in the original publication.

Post-election changes

John Poole appears to have returned to the coalition shortly after the election.  The CCF left the governing coalition in 1943.

Dufferin (dec. John Munn, 1941), June 22, 1943:
Earl Collins (C) accl.

Killarney (dec. John Laughlin, 1941), June 22, 1943:
Abram Harrison (C) 1378
Chapman  987

The Pas (res. John Bracken, January 15, 1943), August 17, 1943:
Beresford Richards (CCF) 3504
McIsaac 1270
Wright 526
Mainwaring 480

Brandon (dec. George Dinsdale, 1943), November 18, 1943:
Dwight Johnson (CCF) 3722
Young  3204

Portage la Prairie (dec. Toby Sexsmith, 1943), November 18, 1943:
Charles Greenlay (C) 1762
Ireland  621
Miller  436

Winnipeg (dec. Stephen Krawchyk, 1943)

St. Boniface (dec. Austin Clarke, 1945)

Morden-Rhineland (res. Wallace Miller, 1945

Dwight Johnson and Beresford Richards were expelled from the CCF caucus in 1945.

See also
 List of Manitoba political parties

References

1941 elections in Canada
1941
1941 in Manitoba
April 1941 events